Arash Ostovari (born 12 December 1992 in Shiraz, Iran) is an Iranian professional footballer who plays as a midfielder for Kirivong Sok Sen Chey FC and former player of Iran U17 and Iran U20.

Club career

Iran
Arash returned to iran in 2013 to serve the mandatory military service of iran at Air force FC in Shiraz.

Thailand
He returned to Pacific Asia with Thai Premier League by joining Bangkok United.

Portugal
Ostovari is the only Iranian player to win the Champion title in three different foreign leagues. He was transferred to Portuguese club Lusitano VRSA the 1 delegation of S.L. Benfica, in 2016 after playing in the Thai Premier League and was selected as the player of the season at the end of the season by Portuguese fans. 
  

the Club channel made a documentary of his life in Portugal as the first iranian players who was transferred to Portugal. Working with Ricardo Sousa had a big impact in his career.

Arash was nicknamed the Iranian Ricardo Quaresma for his style of play.

Singapore
Arash is a resident of Singapore , Where he Joined Bukit Timah Juniors FC on 2018 and was the Capitan of this club.    
Ostovari played for another Singaporean club  Admiralty CSC later on as well.

Cambodia
in Feb 2020 Arash Joined Kirivong Sok Sen Chey FC in Cambodia.

He has also played for Iran's national youth and Olympic Football teams. He played for Esteghlal Tehran FC , Bargh Shiraz FC , Al Naser FC, Bangkok United FC and Lusitano VRSA.

References

External links
www.zerozero.pt: Arash Ostovari page
playmakerstats.com: Arash Ostovari page
forzafootball.com: Arash Ostovari page 
cambodianfootball.com: Arash Ostovari page 
fmdataba.com: Arash Ostovari page 
tudopelofutebol.com.br: Arash Ostovari page

1992 births
Living people
Iranian footballers
Association football midfielders
Esteghlal F.C. players
Fajr Sepasi players
Al-Nasr SC (Salalah) players
Pasargad F.C. players
Arash Ostovari
Iranian expatriate footballers
Expatriate footballers in Oman
Expatriate footballers in Malaysia
Expatriate footballers in the Philippines
Expatriate footballers in Portugal
Iranian expatriate sportspeople in Malaysia
People from Shiraz
Sportspeople from Fars province